Nicolas Rondet is a former Barber Dodge Pro Series and Atlantic Championship driver from Melle, Deux-Sèvres, France.

Career history
After he was born in France he grew up in Brazil and started karting. After a short career in karting and single-seaters the young driver switched to touring cars. He won his first season in the French Citroën AX Cup in 1993. The following season Rondet finished fifth in the series. After this success he moved to the United States of America to race in the Skip Barber Western Series. In his second season the French driver won the championship and the Skip Barber Big Scholarship. The scholarship secured him a seat in the 1997 Barber Dodge Pro Series season. The season was successful as he won one race and scored another two podium finishes. The following season he secured his seat due to his sponsors. Again the driver scored three podium finishes but he had to miss three races. 1998 was also the first season Rondet made his debut in the Atlantic Championship racing at Long Beach and Houston. His best finish was a seventh place at Houston. The Frenchman also raced a single outing in the IMSA GT Championship. At Lime Rock Park he finished thirteenth in a Mazda RX-7.  He returned for a partial Atlantic Championship season the following year. He was places eleventh in the championship scoring one podium finish. After failing to secure a seat for the 2000 season he returned to the Barber Dodge Pro Series in 2001. This season was highly successful as he finished every race in the top 10, winning three races. As he won the title he won a scholarship to race in the 2002 Atlantic Championship season. This season was not so successful as he finished in the top 10 only twice.

Complete motorsports results

American Open-Wheel racing results
(key) (Races in bold indicate pole position, races in italics indicate fastest race lap)

Barber Dodge Pro Series

Atlantic Championship

References

External links
 Official website

1970 births
Formula Ford drivers
French Formula Three Championship drivers
Atlantic Championship drivers
Barber Pro Series drivers
IMSA GT Championship drivers
Sportspeople from Deux-Sèvres
Living people
French racing drivers
24H Series drivers
Michelin Pilot Challenge drivers
Le Mans Cup drivers